Boguchan is a rural locality (a Railway station settlement) in Novosergeyevsky Selsoviet of Arkharinsky District, Amur Oblast, Russia. The population was 63 in 2018.

Geography 
Boguchan is located 28 km southeast of Arkhara (the district's administrative centre) by road. Kamenny Karyer is the nearest rural locality.

References 

Rural localities in Arkharinsky District